Pattern Recognition Letters is a peer-reviewed scientific journal that is published by North Holland, an imprint of Elsevier, on behalf of the International Association for Pattern Recognition. The journal produces 16 issues per year  covering research on pattern recognition. The editors-in-chief are Gunilla Borgefors (Uppsala University), Gabriella Sanniti di Baja (Consiglio Nazionale delle Ricerche, Naples), and Sudeep Sarkar (University of South Florida). According to the Journal Citation Reports, the journal has a 2018 impact factor of  2.810.

Abstracting and indexing
The journal is abstracted and indexed by the following services:

References

External links 
 
 International Association for Pattern Recognition

Computer science journals
Elsevier academic journals
Publications established in 1982
English-language journals